Phil "The Collector" Swern (born Anthony Philip Swern, 30 June 1948) is an English radio producer and music collector, who earned the nickname "The Collector" from working on Sounds of the 60s with Brian Matthew. Born in Ealing, London, he was formerly a record producer and songwriter, and has also written for television. He produced Pick of the Pops for Radio 1 in the late 1980s and early 1990s, and has produced the show along with Tom Du Croz for Radio 2 since 1997. He has also produced Sounds of the 60s for Radio 2 since 2007 and formerly produced the Saturday night Bob Harris Show for the same station, also producing Harris's Radio 1 shows in the early 1990s. He also devised the questions for the PopMaster quiz on Radio 2's Ken Bruce Show until this role was assumed by Neil Myners and Simon Bray. Swern co-wrote the quiz show Pop the Question with Jeremy Beadle and co-created fellow quiz show That's Showbusiness with screenwriter Jeremy Pascall.

His first record production work was Horace Faith's recording of "Black Pearl" for Trojan Records in 1970. He went on to produce for many other musicians, including the Pearls, Polly Brown and R&J Stone, whose "We Do It", released in 1976, reached number 5 on the UK Singles Chart.

Swern has the world's only complete collection of every UK Top 40 chart hit since records began in 1952. His extensive work within the music industry led to him being awarded a BASCA Gold Badge Award in October 2010.

References

External links

45cat list of singles producer credits
45cat list of singles composer credits

1948 births
Living people
English record producers
English songwriters
People from Ealing
English radio producers
BBC radio producers
BBC Radio 2 presenters